The 2014 United States House of Representatives election in Delaware was held on Tuesday, November 4, 2014 to elect the U.S. representative from Delaware's at-large congressional district, who will represent the state of Delaware in the 114th United States Congress. The election coincided with the election of a U.S. Senator from Delaware and other federal and state offices. Incumbent Democratic Congressman John Carney won re-election to a third term in office.

Democratic nomination

Candidates

Declared
 John Carney, incumbent U.S. Representative

Republican nomination

Candidates

Declared
 Rose Izzo, conservative freelance political consultant and candidate for the seat in 2010 and 2012

Other candidates

Green

Nominee
 Bernard "Bernie" August, nominee for the seat in 2012

Libertarian

Nominee
 Scott Gesty, accountant and nominee for the seat in 2012

General election

Polling

Results

References

External links
U.S. House elections in Delaware, 2014 at Ballotpedia
Campaign contributions at OpenSecrets

Delaware
2014
United States House of Representatives